Ashley Suzanne Johnson (born August 9, 1983) is an American actress. She became known as a child actress for her role as Chrissy Seaver on Growing Pains (1990–1992). As an adult, she is known for television roles as Amber Ahmed on The Killing (2011–2012) and Patterson on Blindspot (2015–2020). She has appeared in films such as What Women Want (2000), The Help (2011), and Much Ado About Nothing (2012), and is a cast member on the Dungeons & Dragons web series Critical Role (2015–present). She became the president of the show's charity branch, the Critical Role Foundation, upon its launch in 2020.

As a voice actress, Johnson is known for providing the voice and motion capture of Ellie in The Last of Us (2013), The Last of Us: Left Behind (2014), and The Last of Us Part II (2020). She also voiced television characters Gretchen Grundler on Recess (1997–2001), Terra on Teen Titans (2004–2006) and Teen Titans Go! (2013–present), Jinmay on Super Robot Monkey Team Hyperforce Go! (2004–2006), Gwen Tennyson in the Ben 10 franchise (2008–2014), Renet Tilley on Teenage Mutant Ninja Turtles (2012), Shiseru on Naruto: Shippuden (2015), and Tulip Olsen and Lake on Infinity Train (2019–2020), as well as the video game characters Gortys in Tales from the Borderlands (2014) and Petra in Minecraft: Story Mode (2015–2016) and its sequel (2017).

Johnson has won two BAFTA Games Awards for Performer, winning once each for her performances in The Last of Us and The Last of Us: Left Behind and becoming the only person to have won the award more than once. She also received multiple nominations for her performance in The Last of Us Part II.

Early life
Ashley Suzanne Johnson was born in Camarillo, California, on August 9, 1983, the daughter of former test pilot Nancy (née Spruiell) and exploration ship captain Cliff Johnson. She is of Norwegian, Scottish, and Swedish descent. She has an older brother named Chris and an older sister named Haylie, both of whom have also worked as actors. Her sister later married singer and musician Jonny Lang. Her father was often away for months at a time and would bring back souvenirs from countries such as Japan. He started a new job nine days after Johnson was born and subsequently moved the family to Franklin, Michigan, where they lived for a few years before returning to California and settling in Los Angeles. Johnson attended school in nearby Burbank and later studied violin and piano at the International School of Music in Glendale. When she was 16, her father died of complications from hepatitis C and liver and lung cancer.

Career
Johnson's career began at age six, when she played the role of Chrissy Seaver on the sitcom Growing Pains from 1990 to 1992. The character's age was accelerated from a toddler between seasons for plotting purposes. By the time she was 12, Johnson had been in the casts of eight television series. She later reprised her role as Chrissy in The Growing Pains Movie and Growing Pains: Return of the Seavers. In the one season series Phenom (1993–94), she played the mischievous younger sister of a rising teenage tennis star. She appeared in the 1994 sitcom All-American Girl, which also lasted for only one season. She played DJ's overbearing girlfriend Lisa in the Roseanne episode "The Blaming of the Shrew".  During the 1995–96 ABC lineup, she played Gracie Wallace in the sitcom Maybe This Time. She played Alex Marshall in the 2000 comedy What Women Want. In 2008, she became a regular on the drama Dirt as Sharlee Cates. In 2009, Johnson appeared in "Omega", the first-season finale of Joss Whedon's Dollhouse.

In 2012, she appeared in The Avengers (also directed by Whedon) as Beth, the waitress who is saved by Captain America. She was intended to appear in future films as his newest love interest (as implied in a brief scene in the film), but that plan was shelved and instead actress Emily VanCamp's Sharon Carter character became involved with Rogers. Although her role was minor, the Blu-ray edition of The Avengers contains some deleted scenes that expand her role in the movie and further her interactions with Rogers.

As a voice actress, Johnson's earlier roles included Sean in the U.S. dub of The First Snow of Winter, Gretchen Grundler on Disney's Recess, Terra in the second and fifth seasons of Teen Titans, Jinmay on Super Robot Monkey Team Hyperforce Go! and Gwen Tennyson on Ben 10: Alien Force and future versions of the Ben 10 franchise. A major voice role came when she provided the voice and motion capture for Ellie in the PlayStation action-adventure game The Last of Us, which was released to critical acclaim and commercial success. She won a video game BAFTA for Best Performer and a VGX Award for Best Voice Actress for her role in the game. On March 12, 2015, she won another BAFTA for Best Performer for the same role in the game's downloadable content, The Last of Us: Left Behind.

Johnson appeared in several Geek & Sundry shows, including playing occult specialist Morgan on the web series Spooked, as well as the Alhambra and Dead of Winter episodes on the board gaming web series TableTop. In 2015, she began playing Pike Trickfoot on the Dungeons & Dragons actual play show Critical Role; in 2018, she began playing Yasha Nydoorin in the show's second campaign. Critical Role was both the Webby Winner and the People's Voice Winner in the "Games (Video Series & Channels)" category at the 2019 Webby Awards; the show was also both a finalist and the Audience Honor Winner at the 2019 Shorty Awards. After becoming hugely successful, the Critical Role cast left the Geek & Sundry network in early 2019 and set up their own production company, Critical Role Productions. Soon after, they aimed to raise $750,000 on Kickstarter to create an animated series of their first campaign, but ended up raising over $11 million. In November 2019, Amazon Prime Video announced that they had acquired the streaming rights to this animated series, now titled The Legend of Vox Machina; Johnson reprised her role as Pike Trickfoot. In late 2020, she was made president of the Critical Role Foundation, the studio's charity branch. In June 2021, she was added to the cast of Exandria Unlimited, an anthology spinoff of Critical Role. Three months later, she served as gamemaster for The Nautilus Ark, her own one-shot episode on the Critical Role channel. In October 2021, Johnson's Exandria Unlimited character Fearne returned in Critical Roles third campaign.

Johnson set up a photography company called Infinity Pictures with Mila Shah, her childhood best friend who works as a production assistant and occasional actress; there have been no updates on the company for many years, though it is still registered as being active as of 2022. Johnson and Shah also co-hosted a podcast called Wildly Hot & Bothered, which ran for 13 episodes from 2012 to 2014. In 2015, they created and starred in Little Things, a web miniseries on YouTube about two friends living in Los Angeles and their habit of making awkward everyday situations even worse. The series was not released on YouTube until 2018.

From 2015 to 2020, Johnson played FBI forensic specialist Patterson in the NBC drama series Blindspot. In 2015, she voiced Petra the Warrior in Minecraft: Story Mode by Telltale Games and Mojang. In 2016, she voiced Tulip Olsen in the pilot for Infinity Train and reprised the role for the series in 2019, additionally voicing Lake and the Steward.

In 2020, Johnson reprised the role of Ellie in The Last of Us Part II. For her performance, she was nominated for Best Performance at The Game Awards 2020 and the 2020 BAFTA Games Award for Best Performer in a Leading Role. The game itself was critically acclaimed, winning dozens of awards and breaking the record for most Game of the Year awards received by a single game. She portrayed Ellie's mother, Anna, in the live-action adaptation of The Last of Us. On her performance in the adaptation, The Daily Beast commented that "with less than 10 minutes of screen time, Johnson gives us one of the best scenes of The Last of Us".

Personal life
In 2012, Johnson began a relationship with writer and musician Brian W. Foster, who also hosted the Critical Role after-show Talks Machina from 2016 to 2021. They announced their engagement in December 2018.

Critical Roles first campaign began two years prior to the start of the series as a one-off, simplified Dungeons & Dragons game for Liam O'Brien's birthday. The players enjoyed the game so much that they continued to play it and brought in additional friends, including Johnson, who joined in the second game. After Felicia Day heard about the private home game from Johnson, she approached the group about playing it in a live-streamed format for Geek & Sundry.

Johnson enjoys singing and can play the guitar, piano, violin, and cello; she occasionally posted covers of songs on her SoundCloud page until late 2012. Her performance as Ellie in The Last of Us Part II included acoustic guitar covers of "Future Days" by Pearl Jam, "Take On Me" by A-ha, "True Faith" by New Order, and "Through the Valley" by Shawn James. The duo of Johnson and co-star Troy Baker (in character as Ellie and Joel) also performed a cover of Johnny Cash's rendition of "Wayfaring Stranger", which plays over the end credits of the game. Johnson also provided vocals in two Critical Role theme songs – "Your Turn to Roll" and "It's Thursday Night".

Filmography

Film

Television

Video games

Web series

References

External links
 
 
 

1983 births
Living people
Actresses from California
Actresses from Michigan
American child actresses
American film actresses
American people of Norwegian descent
American people of Scottish descent
American people of Swedish descent
American television actresses
American video game actresses
American voice actresses
BAFTA winners (people)
People from Camarillo, California
People from Franklin, Michigan
People from Greater Los Angeles
Spike Video Game Award winners
20th-century American actresses
21st-century American actresses